Chauny is a commune in the Aisne department in Hauts-de-France in northern France.

History
There has been a settlement on the site, more or less continuously, since at least the Carolingian era.  Known variously as Calgny, Cauny, Canni, Calni or as Chaulni.  In Latin, contemporary chroniclers and historians such as Flodoard, Guibert de Noyon/Nogent used at least 13 different names when referring to it; such as Calnacum, Calniacum, Cauniacum, Calviniacum and Channiacum.

The town was occupied by German forces for part of World War I, and was close to the front lines for much of the war.  It was extensively destroyed during the process of its recapture by Allied forces in 1917.  It is disputed whether, or to what degree, the destruction was caused by Allied bombardments, aerial and artillery, versus demolition by retreating Germans.

The community was rebuilt after that war, largely in a traditional French "châteaux" style; in particular the municipal buildings, done in red brick with stonework. Most of the existing structures date from this time, or later; especially those in the town centre.

During World War II, a chemical factory in the town was bombed by Allied aircraft, on 8 August 1944. This was completed as part of an attack on industrial infrastructure. The town was liberated by American forces on 2 September 1944.

Geography
Built on the banks of the Oise and the Saint-Quentin canal, the town still retains its port to this day. Chauny is roughly equal distances from Soissons (34 km), Laon (36 km) and Saint-Quentin, Aisne (30 km) and is right at the heart of Picardy.

Chauny is well linked to the rest of the region by road : close to the A26 and A29 motorways which head towards Saint Quentin. The national airports in Paris are an hour by car.

The town is served by an important railway network and the railway line has passed through the town since 1849. The railway station in Chauny is part of the Paris - St Quentin - Maubeuge line, and is well serviced by Corail and TER trains towards Paris, Compiègne and Saint Quentin. The station was re built after the war to plans by Urbain Cassan.

The Saint-Quentin canal was built as a junction between the Somme and the Oise in 1738, is popular with barges.

A very modern theatre often shows cultural exhibitions and performances. Close by are the forests of Saint-Gobain and Coucy Basse.

Schools
The town today has three collèges and four lycées: there is a scientific, technical and professional lycée, Jean Macé, a general and technical lycée, Gay-Lussac, a private lycée, Saint-Charles, and a private agricultural lycée, Robert Schuman.

Population

Twin towns – sister cities

Chauny is twinned with:
 Andenne, Belgium
 Bergheim, Germany

Gallery

See also
 Communes of the Aisne department

References
 Local Bus Route Map

Communes of Aisne
Aisne communes articles needing translation from French Wikipedia